27th Brigade or 27th Infantry Brigade may refer to:

 27th Brigade (Australia), an infantry brigade during the Second World War
 27th British Commonwealth Brigade, an amalgamated brigade of the British Commonwealth
 27th Mountain Infantry Brigade (France), a unit of the French Army
 27th (Bangalore) Brigade of the British Indian Army in the First World War
 27th Indian Infantry Brigade of the British Indian Army in the Second World War
 27th Infantry Brigade Combat Team (United States), a unit of the United States Army
 27 Brigade, Taiwanese guerrilla force active after the 228 Incident
Units of the United Kingdom:
 27th (Home Counties) Anti-Aircraft Brigade
 27th Armoured Brigade
 27th Infantry Brigade (United Kingdom)
 27th Brigade Royal Field Artillery

See also
 27th Army (disambiguation)
 27th Battalion (disambiguation)
 27th Division (disambiguation)
 XXVII Corps (disambiguation)
 27th Regiment (disambiguation)
 27 Squadron (disambiguation)